A partial lunar eclipse will take place on July 27, 2037.

Visibility

Related lunar eclipses

Lunar year series

Saros cycle

Tritos series 
 Preceded: Lunar eclipse of August 28, 2026

 Followed: Lunar eclipse of June 26, 2048

Tzolkinex 
 Preceded: Lunar eclipse of June 15, 2030

 Followed: Lunar eclipse of September 7, 2044

See also
List of lunar eclipses and List of 21st-century lunar eclipses

Notes

External links

2037-07
2037-07
2037 in science